Pablo Oscar Bruera (born 1 October 1964)  is an Argentinian politician, who was the mayor of La Plata, the capital of Buenos Aires province, from 2007 to 2015. On December 9, 2007, Bruera replaced incumbent Julio Alak. His run as mayor ended in 2015 when he was replaced by Julio Garro.

Bruera's nephew, Lucas, is a professional footballer.

References

External links

 
 

1964 births
Mayors of La Plata
Living people